Alexandra Kavadas (born 31 August 1983), known in Greece as Alexandra Kavvada, is an American-born Greek retired footballer who played as a defender. She has been a member of the Greece women's national team.

College career
Kavadas attended the University of Connecticut in Storrs, Connecticut.

Club career
Kavadas played for Greater Boston in the United States.

International career
Kavadas played for Greece at senior level in the 2004 Summer Olympics.

See also
 Greece at the 2004 Summer Olympics

References

External links
 
 FIFA.com
 UConn player profile

1983 births
Living people
Women's association football defenders
Greek women's footballers
Greece women's international footballers
Olympic footballers of Greece
Footballers at the 2004 Summer Olympics
American women's soccer players
Soccer players from Massachusetts
Sportspeople from Newton, Massachusetts
Sportspeople from Boston
American people of Greek descent
Sportspeople of Greek descent
Citizens of Greece through descent
UConn Huskies women's soccer players
21st-century American women